Kachpurites is an uppermost Jurassic (Tithonian) ammonite included in the perisphincacean family, Craspeditidae; although some classifiers put the Craspeditidae a subfamily in the Polyptychitidae.  The shell of Kachpurites is subinvolute with a rounded section and bears low, close spaced, moderately sinuous ribs.

Kachpurites is characteristic of the lower part of the upper Volgan substage in the Russian Platform.

References 

 Kachpurites in jsdammonites 
 Introductory discussion by V.V. Mita (2010) 
 Arkell,et al, 1957. Mesozoic Ammonoidea. Treatise on Invertebrate Paleontology, Part L. Geological Soc of America and Univ. Kansas Press.

Ammonitida
Jurassic ammonites
Fossils of Russia
Tithonian life